Nationality words link to articles with information on the nation's poetry or literature (for instance, Irish or France).

Events

Works

Great Britain
 Sir William Alexander:
 Aurora
 A Paraenesis to the Prince (to Henry, Prince of Wales)
 Thomas Bateson, Cantus (the first English madrigals)
 Nicholas Breton, The Passionate Shepheard; or, The Shepheardes Love, written under the pen name "Bonerto"
 Thomas Churchyard, Churchyards Good Will, on the death of John Whitgift, Archbishop of Canterbury
 John Cooke, Epigrames
 Thomas Dekker, Newes from Graves-end: Sent to Nobody, published anonymously
 Michael Drayton:
 Moyses in a Map of his Miracles
 The Owle
 A Paean Triumphall
 Samuel Rowlands, Looke to it: for, Ile Stabbe Ye
 Anthony Skoloker, Daiphantus, or the Passions of Love

Other
 Bernardo de Balbuena, La Grandeza Mexicana ("Mexico's Grandeur"), Spanish poet and churchman at this time in Mexico
 Jean Vauquelin de La Fresnaye, Discours pour servir de Préface sur le Sujet de la Satyre ("Discourse Serving as a Preface on the Subject of Satire") published from this year through 1605

Births
 January 4 – Jakob Balde (died 1668), German scholar, poet and teacher
 July 8 – Heinrich Albert (died 1651), German composer and poet
 August 4 – François Hédelin (died 1676), French abbé of Aubignac and Meymac, poet and playwright
 October 16 – Assoucy (died 1677), French musician and burlesque poet
 November 23 (bapt.) – Jasper Mayne (died 1672), English clergyman, translator, minor poet and dramatist
Also:
 Charles Cotin (died 1681), French abbé, philosopher and poet
 Girolamo Graziani (died 1675), Italian poet
 Philippe Habert (died 1637), French poet
 Cheng Zhengkui (died 1670), Chinese landscape painter and poet

Deaths
 April 1 – Thomas Churchyard (born c. 1520), English poet and author
 June 24 – Edward de Vere, 17th Earl of Oxford (born 1550), English courtier, playwright, poet, sportsman, patron of numerous writers, and sponsor of at least two acting companies
 October 8 – Janus Dousa (born 1545), Dutch statesman, historian, poet and philologist
 November – Thomas Storer (born c. 1571), English poet
 Also – Ma Xianglan (born 1548), Chinese artist, playwright, poet and calligrapher; a woman

Notes

17th-century poetry
Poetry